Hans Christian Lumbye (2 May 1810 – 20 March 1874) was a Danish composer of waltzes, polkas, mazurkas and galops, among other things.

Beginnings
As a child, he studied music in Randers and Odense, and by age 14 he was playing the trumpet in a military band. In 1829, he joined the Horse Guards in Copenhagen, still continuing his music education. In 1839, he heard a Viennese orchestra play music by Johann Strauss I, after which he composed in the style of Strauss, eventually earning the nickname "The Strauss of the North".

Career
From 1843 to 1872, he served as the music director and in-house composer for Tivoli Gardens, Copenhagen. Such was his popularity in the Danish capital that many Danes revered him and considered Johann Strauss II as the "Lumbye of the South".

Works
Lumbye is best known for his light compositions, many of which evoke non-musical sources. The Champagne Galop, for example, begins with the "pop" of a champagne cork, and the Copenhagen Steam Railway Galop faithfully recreates the sounds of a train chugging out of a station and grinding to a halt at the next stop. He honored the Swedish Nightingale with a "Souvenir de Jenny Lind, Vals" from 1845.

Galops
 Jubel-Galop (1840(1844)
 Juliane Galop (1843-1844)
 Copenhagen Steam Railway Galop (1844)
 Telegraph Galop (1844)
 Castilianer-Galop (1847)
 Capriccio Galop (1851)
 Juleballet (1855)Champagne Galop (1865)
 Cirque de Loisset Galop (1862)
 Bouquet-Royal Galop (1870)
 Kanon Galop (1853)

March music
 Marche du Nord (1856-1857)
 Kronings Marsch (1860)
 Kong Frederik den Syvendes Honneur-Marsch (1861)
 Kong Christian D. 9des Honneur March (1864)
 Kong Carl d. XVdes Honneur March (1869)
 Kong Georg den 1stes Honneur Marsch (1973)

Polkas
 Caroline Polka (1843)
 Casino-Polka (1846)
 Amager-Polka (1849)
 Camilla Polka (1863)
 Otto Allins Tromme-Polka (1863/1864)
 PetersborgerindenValses
 Krolls Ballklänge Amelie-Vals Casino Vals (1847)
 Catharina Vals'' (1857)

Personal life
He was the father of two musician sons, Carl Christian (9 July 1841 - 10 August 1911) and Georg August (26 August 1843 - 1922), who took over his orchestra after his father's death. His grandson Georg Høeberg was an important Danish conductor at Det kongelige Teater.

References

External links
 
 The Danish Royal Library archive of Lumbye's works 
 The Lumbye Society
 Source

1810 births
1874 deaths
Danish classical composers
Danish male classical composers
Danish Romantic composers
Ballet composers
Danish conductors (music)
Male conductors (music)
19th-century classical composers
19th-century conductors (music)
Burials at Holmen Cemetery
19th-century Danish composers